The James Buchanan Memorial is a bronze and granite memorial in the southeast corner of  Meridian Hill Park Northwest, Washington, D.C.  It was designed by architect William Gorden Beecher, and sculpted by Maryland artist Hans Schuler.

Commissioned in 1916, but not approved by the U.S. Congress until 1918, it was completed and unveiled June 26, 1930.  The memorial features a statue of Buchanan bookended by male and female classical figures representing law and diplomacy, engraved with text from a member of Buchanan's cabinet, Jeremiah S. Black: 

The memorial in the nation's capital complemented an earlier monument, constructed in 1907–08 and dedicated in 1911, on the site of Buchanan's birthplace in Mercersburg, Pennsylvania.

See also
 List of sculptures of presidents of the United States
 Presidential memorials in the United States

References

External links
http://www.c-spanvideo.org/program/298193-1
http://dcmemorialist.com/2010/03/buchanan-statue/
Buchanan Memorial, HABS, Library of Congress

1930 sculptures
Cultural depictions of James Buchanan
Meridian Hill/Malcolm X Park
Monuments and memorials in Washington, D.C.
Sculptures of men in Washington, D.C.
Buchanan, James
Statues in Washington, D.C.